Eric Stephen Jagielo (born May 17, 1992) is an American former professional baseball third baseman. He played college baseball for the Notre Dame Fighting Irish.

Career

Amateur
Jagielo attended Downers Grove North High School in Downers Grove, Illinois. The Chicago Cubs selected him in the 50th round of the 2010 Major League Baseball draft. Rather than turn professional, Jagielo enrolled at the University of Notre Dame, and played college baseball for the Notre Dame Fighting Irish from 2011 to 2013. As a junior, he was named the Big East Conference Player of the Year. During his career he hit .321/.420/.532 with 27 home runs and 124 runs batted in (RBIs). In 2012, he played collegiate summer baseball for the Harwich Mariners of the Cape Cod Baseball League, and was named a league all-star.

New York Yankees
The New York Yankees selected Jagielo in the first round of the 2013 Major League Baseball draft. He signed and made his professional debut that season for the Staten Island Yankees. In 54 games, he hit .268/.381/.458 with six home runs. He played for the Tampa Yankees in 2014, and hit .259 with a .354 on-base percentage, 16 home runs, and 54 RBIs in 85 games. In an instructional game after the season, Jagielo was hit in the face by a pitch, breaking the zygomatic arch near his left eye, which required surgery. He spent 2015 with the Trenton Thunder where he batted .284 with nine home runs and 35 RBIs in 58 games.

Cincinnati Reds
On December 28, 2015, the Yankees traded Jagielo, Rookie Davis, Tony Renda, and Caleb Cotham to the Cincinnati Reds in exchange for Aroldis Chapman. Jagielo spent 2016 with the Pensacola Blue Wahoos where he batted .205 with seven home runs and 26 RBIs in 111 games. In 2017, he played for both Pensacola and the Louisville Bats, posting a .204 batting average with five home runs and 25 RBIs in 103 total games.

Miami Marlins
In March 2018, the Miami Marlins acquired Jagielo in exchange for cash considerations. He split the season between the New Orleans Baby Cakes and Jacksonville Jumbo Shrimp.

He was released by Miami in March 2019 and has    not played since.

References

External links

Notre Dame Fighting Irish bio

1992 births
Living people
Notre Dame Fighting Irish baseball players
Harwich Mariners players
Gulf Coast Yankees players
Staten Island Yankees players
Tampa Yankees players
Trenton Thunder players
People from Downers Grove, Illinois
Baseball players from Illinois
Sportspeople from DuPage County, Illinois
Pensacola Blue Wahoos players
Louisville Bats players
Jacksonville Jumbo Shrimp players